The John George Ott House is a historic residence located in Madison, Wisconsin, United States, that is listed on the National Register of Historic Places.

Description
The house is located at 754 Jenifer Street and is within the Jenifer-Spaight Historic District. It is an example of Italianate architecture.

History
The house was built in 1873 by Swiss immigrant John George Ott. In 1979, it was designated a landmark by the Madison Landmarks Commission. Additionally, the house is located within the Jenifer-Spaight Historic District.

It was added to the National Register of Historic Places on September 23, 1982.

See also

 National Register of Historic Places listings in Madison, Wisconsin

References

External links

Houses in Madison, Wisconsin
Houses completed in 1873
Houses on the National Register of Historic Places in Wisconsin
National Register of Historic Places in Madison, Wisconsin
Italianate architecture in Wisconsin
Individually listed contributing properties to historic districts on the National Register in Wisconsin
1873 establishments in Wisconsin